Freddy Mansveld (born 2 August 1911, date of death unknown) was a Belgian bobsledder who competed in the late 1940s. He won a silver medal in the four-man event at the 1948 Winter Olympics in St. Moritz.

References
Bobsleigh four-man Olympic medalists for 1924, 1932–56, and since 1964
DatabaseOlympics.com profile
Freddy Mansveld's profile at Sports Reference.com
Retrospective on Max Houben

1911 births
Belgian male bobsledders
Bobsledders at the 1948 Winter Olympics
Year of death missing
Olympic medalists in bobsleigh
Medalists at the 1948 Winter Olympics
Olympic silver medalists for Belgium
Olympic bobsledders of Belgium